Loučná pod Klínovcem (until 1947 Český Wiesenthal) is a town in Chomutov District in the Ústí nad Labem Region of the Czech Republic. It has about 100 inhabitants and it is the second least populated town in the country.

Administrative parts
The town is made up of two parts, Háj and Loučná.

Geography
The town lies on the border with Germany, the German part of the divided town is called Oberwiesenthal. It lies in the Ore Mountains.

History
The first written mention of Loučná pod Klínovcem is from 1431, under its German name Wiesenthal. The village was probably founded in the 14th century. The village was destroyed during the Hussite Wars and was abandoned. At the beginning of the 16th century, mining developed in the area, Loučná pod Klínovcem was resettled and its importance began to grow.

Transport
There is the road border crossing Loučná / Oberwiesenthal with Germany.

Sport
There is a large ski resort on the slopes of Klínovec.

Notable people
Hans Erich Slany (1926–2013), German industrial designer

References

External links

Cities and towns in the Czech Republic
Populated places in Chomutov District
Towns in the Ore Mountains
Divided cities
Czech Republic–Germany border crossings